The Twin Peaks are a pair of high points located within the Wasatch Range foothills in Salt Lake City, Utah. They are usually referred to as the Avenues Twin Peaks, to distinguish them from the nearby and much-higher Broads Fork Twin Peaks and American Fork Twin Peaks. The Avenues Twin Peaks are a popular hiking destination.

References 

Mountains of Utah
Mountains of Salt Lake County, Utah
Wasatch Range